Depressed Mode is a death/doom/funeral doom metal band from Finland.

History 
Depressed Mode was formed in 2005 as a solo project of Ossy Salonen. Tomppa Turpeinen later joined as guitarist and Natalie Koskinen (Shape of Despair) as second vocalist. The band was signed by Firebox Records and recorded their first album Ghosts of Devotion with drummer Marko Tommila. 

Jori Haukio left the band in late 2007, and Teemu Heinola took his place as a guitarist. Marko Tommila left the band in 2008 and Iiro Aittokoski replaced him.

The band recorded its second album ..For Death in summer 2008, which was released in February 2009; Kerrang! gave the album a 3/5 rating.

In a 2018 interview with doom-metal.com regarding Depressed Mode, vocalist Natalie Koskinen stated  that nobody actively placed it to the side, but "life happened and Ossi wanted to centralize on his main work and family." Koskinen aired skepticism that Depressed Mode would ever be active again.

In December 2020, the band released a statement regarding production of their 3rd studio album, stating that it would be released some time in 2021; the album, Decade of Silence, was subsequently released in May 2022.

Personnel 
 Ossy Salonen – vocals, synth, programming
 Natalie Koskinen – vocals
 Tomppa Turpeinen – guitars
 Iiro Aittokoski – drums
 Teemu Heinola – guitars
 Henri Hakala – bass

Discography 
 Ghosts of Devotion (2007)
 ...For Death (2009)
 Decade of Silence (2022)

References

External links 
 
 Depressed Mode at Encyclopaedia Metallum
 Depressed Mode at Firebox Records
 Depressed Mode at myspace.com
 Depressed Mode at mikseri.net

Musical groups established in 2005
Finnish doom metal musical groups
Finnish death metal musical groups
Funeral doom musical groups